Fonthill Castle may refer to:

Fonthill Castle and the Administration Building of the College of Mount St. Vincent, in The Bronx, New York, New York
Fonthill (house), in Doylestown, Pennsylvania